Gyde may refer to:

 Gyde Jørgensen, 1911 Danish chess champion
 Gyde Spandemager (died 1543), alleged Danish witch
 Gyda of Sweden (died c. 1048/1049), Swedish princess and Danish queen consort
 Praxille Gydé, French boxer, European Boxing Union flyweight champion, 1932–1935

See also
 GYD (disambiguation)